The 2023 European Athletics U20 Championships will be the twenty-seventh edition of the biennial athletics competition between European  athletes under the age of twenty. The 2023 European Athletics U20 Championships are organized by European Athletics Association and scheduled to be held from 7–10 August 2023 in Jerusalem, Israel. Initially the competition was awarded to Cluj-Napoca, Romania but due to Cluj Arena not being fit for such championships, European Athletics decided to award the competition to Israel.

Results

Men

Track 

* Indicates the athletes only competed in the preliminary heats and received medals.

Field

Combined

Women

Track 

* Indicates the athletes only competed in the preliminary heats and received medals.

Field

Combined

Entry standards 
The qualification period runs from 1 January 2022 to 27 July 2023. A maximum of three athletes per member federation may participate in each individual event if they all have achieved the qualifying standard. Each member federation may enter one athlete in each individual event if their athletes have not achieved the qualifying standard for that event, but the total number of such athletes may not exceed two men and two women in total. The host country may enter one athlete in every discipline regardless of the entry standards.

References

External links
 European Athletics website
 Athletics – European U-20 Championships – 2023 – Detailed results The Sports

2023 
2023 U20
Under-20 athletics competitions
Continental athletics championships
Biennial athletics competitions
European U20 Championships
Scheduled sports events
International sports competitions hosted by Israel
2023 in Israeli sport
July 2023 sports events in Europe
Athletics in Israel
2020s in Israel